Standings and results for Group 2 of the UEFA Euro 2000 qualifying tournament.

Standings

Matches

Goalscorers

References

Group 2
1998–99 in Greek football
1999–2000 in Greek football
1998–99 in Georgian football
1999–2000 in Georgian football
1998–99 in Albanian football
1999–2000 in Albanian football
1998 in Norwegian football
1999 in Norwegian football
1998 in Latvian football
1999 in Latvian football
Norway at UEFA Euro 2000
Slovenia at UEFA Euro 2000